Amos Burr Casselman (November 14, 1850 – November 30, 1929) was an American archer. He competed in the men's double American round at the 1904 Summer Olympics in St. Louis, Missouri.

References

External links

1850 births
1929 deaths
Olympic archers of the United States
American male archers
Archers at the 1904 Summer Olympics
People from Canton, Ohio
Sportspeople from Ohio